Randy Mattingly (born May 15, 1951) is a former gridiron football quarterback who played in the Canadian Football League. He played college football at Evansville.

College career
Mattingly attended Florida State as a freshman but left and moved back to Evansville after his older brother died in a construction accident. He enrolled at the University of Evansville and was named All-Indiana Collegiate Conference as a junior and as a senior. He also competed in baseball, basketball, and track and field for Evansville.

Professional career
Mattingly was selected in the fourth round of the 1973 NFL Draft by the Cleveland Browns. He was cut at the end of training camp and spent the 1973 season on the practice squads of the Browns, Chicago Bears, Buffalo Bills and Cincinnati Bengals. He was signed by the Saskatchewan Roughriders of the Canadian Football League (CFL) in 1974 and spent two seasons with the team as a backup and completed 35 of 65 passes for 553 yards and four touchdowns with six interceptions. Mattingly was signed by the Hamilton Tiger-Cats in 1976, where he was primarily used as a punter but also started at quarterback in place of injured starter Jimmy Jones.

Personal life
Mattingly is the older brother of former Major League Baseball player and manager Don Mattingly.

References

External links
Evansville Hall of Fame bio

1951 births
Living people
American football quarterbacks
Canadian football quarterbacks
American players of Canadian football
Evansville Purple Aces football players
Players of American football from Indiana
Cleveland Browns players
Saskatchewan Roughriders players
Hamilton Tiger-Cats players
Sportspeople from Evansville, Indiana
Canadian football punters
Evansville Purple Aces baseball players
Evansville Purple Aces men's basketball players